The Christian Community Bible is a translation of the Christian Bible in the English language originally produced in the Philippines.

It is part of a family of translations in multiple languages intended to be more accessible to ordinary readers, particularly those in Third World countries.  The primary features of these translations are the use of the language of ordinary people and the inclusion of extensive commentaries aimed at helping its readers to understand the meaning of the biblical texts.

Version in English

History 
The Christian Community Bible began to be produced in 1986 when Rev. Alberto Rossa, a Claretian missionary in the Philippines, saw the need for an English version. With the help of the French priest Bernard Hurault, the translation was finished in 18 months. The work was published in 1988. The editors of the Christian Community Bible consider it to be a very accurate translation from the Hebrew and Greek biblical texts. New editions are currently coordinated by the Pastoral Bible Foundation and are currently published by Claretian Publications (also known as Claretian Communications).

Features
The editors of the Christian Community Bible have slightly reorganized the books of the bible with respect to the usual Catholic canon. While the New Testament books are found in the same order as they are found in other bibles, this is not the case for the Old Testament (the Hebrew Bible and the deuterocanonical books). According to the introduction to the seventeenth edition: "Here we kept, in broad outlines, the distribution of the books according to the three categories present in the Jewish or Hebrew bible". The result is that the Christian Community Bible's order is a blend of the Jewish and Catholic order (here represented by the Douay–Rheims Bible). The King James Version is also listed for comparison purposes:

Versions in other languages
There are versions of the Christian Community Bible in 10 languages: Indonesian (Kitab Suci Komunitas Kristiani), Chinese (mùlíng shèngjīng), Cebuano (Biblia sa Kristohanong Katilingban), Chavacano, French (Bible des Peuples), Ilonggo (Biblia Sang Katilingban Sang Mga Kristiano), Korean, Quechuan, Spanish (Biblia Latinoamericana) and Tagalog (Biblia ng Sambayanang Pilipino).

Chinese

The Pastoral Bible was published in 1999 in traditional Chinese (subsequently also available in simplified Chinese). Since its publication, this translation has been in the centre of a controversy regarding the translation process and the content of its commentaries. Because of the criticisms, some regard this translation as being a poor translation unsuitable for lay people without extensive prior theological training; at the same time, despite these criticisms, there are also people who recommend this translation to lay people.

French
The Bible des Peuples (literally "Bible of the Peoples") is a version translated by Bernard and Louis Hurault and published in 1998. The version is still considered controversial by some in the Jewish community because of replacement theology overtones in its notes.

A previous version in French language, called Bible des Communautés chrétiennes (literally "Bible of the Christian Communities"), was translated by Bernard and Louis Hurault and published in 1994. Its imprimatur was rescinded in 1995 amid accusations of having anti-semitic overtones in its commentaries.

Spanish 
The Biblia Latinoamérica (literally "Latin America Bible") was begun in 1960 by Rev. Bernardo Hurault in Chile and published in 1972. Hurault decided that a Bible that can be understood by ordinary poor people is needed, and that this Bible should include commentaries to help its readers understand it. He began translating from Hebrew and Greek to Spanish, incorporating his own homilies and questions from his own congregation as commentaries. 

This edition was deemed unfit for liturgical use in Argentina (by the CEA). The Congregation for the Doctrine of the Faith along with the bishops of Argentina ordered the elimination or extensive revision of notes, introductions and photographs of a contentious and misleading, often politically driven (see Liberation theology), character.

See also
Catholic Bible
Latin Vulgate
Council of Trent
Divino afflante Spiritu
Second Vatican Council
Dei verbum
Liturgiam authenticam

Notes

References

External links 
    Online version

Bible translations into English
Catholic bibles